Clementina, although wrongly and popularly known as La Clementina, is a zarzuela in two acts by Luigi Boccherini. The Spanish-language libretto was by Ramón de la Cruz. It premiered at the end of 1786 at the Palace Puerta de la Vega, Madrid.

Clementina is the only complete stage work by Boccherini. It was written when the zarzuela was close to the end of its period of greatest success, before this genre, at the beginning of the 19th century, was nearly forgotten in favour of the Italian opera. The librettist of Clementina, Ramón de la Cruz, had attempted to introduce innovations in the zarzuela, using folk elements instead of the more usual mythological subjects. The music is predominantly cheerful and turned towards comical sides, with pathetic fragments when it tries to describe unrequited love.

This work was written on commission of the Duchess-Countess of Osuna-Benavente, a maecenas lover of music and arts who owned a private orchestra, under whose protection De La Cruz worked. Clementina premiered in Madrid in the palace of the Countess, probably performed by amateur singers. Boccherini composed the music in less than one month. A further performance of Clementina took place in 1799, again in Madrid, in the Coliseo de los Caños del Peral, this time with very known artists: Catalina Tordesillas (Clementina), Manuela Monteis (Damiana), Joaquina Arteaga (Narcisa), Lorenza Correa (Cristeta), Vicente Sanchez (Don Urbano) e Manuel Garcia Parra (Don Lazzaro).

In modern times, Clementina was revived in Venice (La Fenice, 18 September 1951), in Munich (Cuvilliés Theatre, 1960) and in Aranjuez (Spain). A further performance was produced in Lucca in 2005.

Roles

Synopsis
The daughters of Don Clemente, Clementina and Narcisa, are courted respectively by Don Urbano and by the marquis de la Ballesta, but they do not accept the marriage proposals of their suitors. Don Clemente reveals that Clementina is not his natural daughter, but was adopted when she was a little child. Gradually, Don Urbano realizes that Clementina is his sister, of whom he had lost all trace and for whom he has been in search for long time. The opera ends with the marriages between Don Urbano and Narcisa, the marquis and Clementina, Don Lazzaro and Cristeta.

Orchestration and structure
Clementina is scored for the following instruments:
2 flutes, 2 oboes, 2 bassoons, 2 horns, strings.

Clementina includes the ouverture, 12 arias, 2 obbligato recitatives and 6 ensembles, plus the dialogues.

Recordings

References
Notes

Sources

External links

Compositions by Luigi Boccherini
Zarzuelas
1786 operas
Operas set in Spain
Spanish-language operas